Şêxbizin is a Kurdish tribe present near Koy Sanjaq in Kurdistan Region, Iraq with smaller communities dispersed throughout Turkey. While the tribe speaks Sorani in Kurdistan Region, the ones in Turkey have kept their tribal sub-dialect of Laki called Şêxbizinî or Kirmancekîman. Nonetheless, many in Turkey only know Turkish due to the assimilatory policies of Turkey.

They lived around Kermanshah in present-day Iran but were expelled towards Ottoman Kirkuk by Safavid Ismail I in the 16th century. Many members of the tribe would later migrate towards Anatolia.

Etymology
It is believed that the name of the tribe is a compound of the two words sheikh and Bazan. The latter is the name of the region near Sulaymaniyah where they were exiled to before relocating to Anatolia decades after. The name appears in different spellings in Ottoman documents.

History 
The tribe was caught between the many wars between the Ottomans and the Safavids in Kurdistan and were forced to leave towards Kirkuk by the Safavids after failed negotiations between Shah Ismail and Şêxbizinî leader Qazî Hûseyîn. The reason for the exile was the religious beliefs of the tribe since they were Sunni. Entering Ottoman Kurdistan, they were tolerated by Sultan Selim I since he was attempting to gather support from Sunni Kurdish tribes against the Safavids. Due to the support from the Şêxbizin during the Battle of Chaldiran, the tribe received privileges including the liberty to settle wherever they wanted. This allowed members of the tribe to migrate upward towards Anatolia after temporarily staying in Palu. By the end of the 18th century, the tribe lived in Haymana during the winter and around Antalya, Samsun and Aydın in the summer.

In his work on Kurdish tribes in 1908, Mark Sykes mentioned the Şêxbizin tribe near Kirkuk which numbered around 4,000 families. He wrote: 

Many Şêxbizin Kurds were Peshmerga and fought with the Kurdish leader Mustafa Barzani during the Iraqi–Kurdish conflict.

Settlements 

The Şêxbizin tribe lives in the following towns and villages:

Kurdistan Region 
Villages populated by the Şêxbizin tribe in Erbil Governorate:
Bengane
Berdespi
Bincî
Cedide
Darmanava jêr
Darmanava jor
Kanîya Sûleyman
Kasika
Minare
Xorxor

Ankara and Konya Provinces 
Villages populated by the Şêxbizin tribe in Ankara Province and Konya Province in Turkey:
 Aktepe (in Haymana district)
 Altıpınar (in Haymana district)
 Ataköy (in Haymana district)
 Bahçecik (in Haymana district)
 Balçıkhisar (in Haymana district)
 Bostanhöyük (in Haymana district)
 Canımana (in Kulu district)
 Dereköy (in Haymana district)
 Dipdede (in Kulu district)
 Durutlar (in Haymana district)
 Eskikışla (in Haymana district)
 Evci (in Haymana district)
 Evliyafakı (in Haymana district)
 Gedik (in Haymana district)
 Gültepe (in Haymana district)
 Kanlıgöl (in Haymana district - depopulated in 1960 after a blood feud)
 Karacadere (in Kulu district)
 Karaömerli (in Haymana district)
 Karapınar (in Haymana district)
 Kavak (in Haymana district)
 Kayabaşı (in Polatlı district)
 İncirli (in Haymana district)
 Pınarbaşı (in Haymana district)
 Sarıgöl (in Haymana district)
 Sazağası (in Haymana district)
 Sinanlı (in Haymana district)
 Soğukkuyu (in Kulu district)
 Söğüttepe (in Haymana district)
 Tabaklı (in Haymana district)
 Yaprakbayır (in Haymana district)
 Sindiren (formerly known as Yenice, in Haymana district)
 Yergömü (in Haymana district)
 Yeşilköy (in Haymana district)
 Yukarısebil (in Haymana district)
 Yurtbeyli (in Haymana district)

Other provinces 
Villages populated by the Şêxbizin tribe in Turkey outside of the provinces of Ankara and Konya:
Bahçeköy (in the center district, Düzce Province)
Bayamca (in Boyabat district, Sinop Province)
Ballıca (in the center district, Düzce Province)
Beygircioğlu (in Kargı district, Çorum Province)
Binerli (in Boyabat district, Sinop Province)
Çamlıpınar (in Laçin district, Çorum Province)
Çayağzı (in Durağan district, Sinop Province)
Dededağı (in Bafra district, Kastamonu Province)
Dumanoğlu (in Aşkale district, Erzurum Province)
Gemet (in the center district, Çorum Province)
Güllüdağ (in Narman district, Erzurum Province)
İçmeler (in Gölyaka district, Düzce Province)
İğdeli (in Oltu district, Erzurum Province)
Karasoku (in Laçin district, Çorum Province)
Koçkaya (in Narman district, Erzurum Province)
Kuruçalı (in Narman district, Erzurum Province)
Mamure (in the center district, Düzce Province)
Meşepınarı (in Karapürçek district, Sakarya Province)
Olukbaşı (in Durağan district, Sinop Province)
Paşakonağı (in the center district, Düzce Province)
Pınaryolu (in Narman district, Erzurum Province)
Sapanlı (in Narman district, Erzurum Province)
Sıtma (in Laçin district, Çorum Province)
Tekpınar (in Ispir district, Erzurum Province)
Tektaban (in Karapürçek district, Sakarya Province)
Topkaynak (in Oltu district, Erzurum Province
Yarmankaya (in Tortum district, Erzurum Province)
Yazılıgürgen (in Karapürçek district, Sakarya Province)
Yeniköy (in Boyabat district, Sinop Province)
Yenitaşköprü (in the center district, Düzce Province)
Yeşilyurt (in Boyabat district, Sinop Province)
Yüksel (in Karapürçek district, Sakarya Province)

Europe
There is a Şêxbizin community in Austria, Denmark, Germany and France.

See also
Reşwan (tribe)

References

Notes

Further reading

History of Ankara Province
History of Kermanshah Province
History of Kirkuk Governorate
Kurdish tribes
History of Konya Province